Exesilla is a genus of sea snails, marine gastropod mollusks in the family Pyramidellidae, the pyrams and their allies.

Species
Species within the genus Exesilla include:
 Exesilla conicera (Laseron, 1959)
 Exesilla dextra (Saurin, 1959)
 Exesilla gisela (Thiele, 1925)
 Exesilla laseroni Robba, Di Geronimo, Chaimanee, Negri & Sanfilippo, 2004
 Exesilla sulcata Laseron, 1959

References

 Robba E. (2013) Tertiary and Quaternary fossil pyramidelloidean gastropods of Indonesia. Scripta Geologica 144: 1-191

External links
 To World Register of Marine Species

Pyramidellidae
Gastropod genera